Carl Axel Harstrom (December 20, 1863 – January 24, 1926) was an American educator, and one term Republican mayor of Norwalk, Connecticut from 1915 to 1917.

Early life and family 
Harstrom was born in Västerås, Sweden. He was the son of Carl Gustaf and Amelia Adolphina Fosberg Harstrom. His father was a manufacturer in Sweden who brought his family to America in 1872, when Carl Axel was nine years of age. He attended the Peekskill Military Academy, and graduated in 1880. He taught school for two years before entering Hobart College. He graduated as valedictory orator and with magna cum laude honors. He earned an A.B in 1886, and an M.A. in 1889. He served as headmaster at the Peekskill Academy for three years, and principle of Vienland Preparatory School for four years. On June 20, 1888, Professor Harstrom married Lee Selden Partridge of Phelps, New York.

Life in Norwalk 
He moved to Norwalk in 1891 to take a position as headmaster of the Norwalk Military Academy. He started his own private preparatory school for boys in Norwalk in 1893.

While teaching and serving as headmaster, he also pursued his own education at Yale University  in classical Philology from 1896 to 1899. He earned his PhD in 1899. He was a member of Theta Delta Chi, and served as its national president for five consecutive terms.

Political career 
In Norwalk, he served as a member of the Board of Estimate.
In 1915, Harstrom was elected mayor of Norwalk and served a two-year term. During 
his term of office he reconstructed the financial system, with the result of making it more transparent to the public. He is credited with introducing voting machines to Norwalk. He is also credited for the many miles of hard pavement laid during his term.

During the World War he was chairman of the local draft board. He was a founding board member of the Norwalk Savings Bank and of the Fairfield County Savings Bank.

Associations 
 Member, American Philological Association
 Member, Phi Beta Kappa Society
 Member, Yale Club of New York City
 Member, Norwalk Club
 Member, Knob Outing Club of Norwalk
 Vestryman, Grace Episcopal Church
 President of the Grand Lodge, Theta Delta Chi
 Member, Senior Warden, Master Mason (1917), Worshipful Master (1922), St. John's Lodge No. 6, Free and Accepted Masons

Awards 
 Valedictorian, Hobart College
 Horace White Essay Prize
 Junior Greek Prize
 Senior Debate Prize
 Phi Beta Kappa

References 

1863 births
1926 deaths
American educators
American philologists
Connecticut Republicans
Hobart and William Smith Colleges alumni
Mayors of Norwalk, Connecticut
People from Västerås
Yale University alumni